The Goethals Medal is a national award given annually by the Society of American Military Engineers (SAME) to a registered engineer who is also a member of SAME prior to nomination.  The nominated engineer must have made eminent and notable contributions in engineering, design, or construction in the past five years.

The award is named in honor of General George Washington Goethals, a civil engineer and United States Army officer best known for his work as Chief engineer on the Panama Canal and his service in WWI as Acting Quartermaster General.

Past award winners

 1956 Dr. David B. Steinman
 1957 Lt. Gen. Raymond A. Wheeler
 1958 Col. Walker L. Cisler
 1959 John W. Sibert, Jr.
 1960 Lt. Gen. Samuel D. Sturgis, Jr.
 1961 Brig. Gen. Thomas J. Hayes III
 1962 Lt. Col. E. Robert de Luccia
 1963 CoI. Ralph A. Tudor
 1964 John P. Davis
 1965 Edwin E. Abbott
 1966 Rear Adm. Robert R. Wooding
 1967 Capt. Albert Rhoades Marshall
 1968 Col. Jerome 0. Ackerman
 1969 Wendell W. Ralphe
 1970 Dr. Arsham Amirikian
 1971 Robert Y. Hudson
 1972 Dr. Michael Yachnis
 1973 Robert H. Hayes
 1974 Col. John E. Catlin, Jr.
 1975 James Polk Stafford, Jr.
 1976 Henry W. Holiday
 1977 Garland L. Watts
 1978 Arthur Casagrande
 1979 E. Montford Fucik
 1980 Robert J. Taylor
 1981 Michael A. Kolessar
 1982 Euclid C. Moore
 1983 George J. Zeiler
 1984 Dr. Alexander G. Tarics
 1985 Edward Cohen
 1986 William L. Stevens
 1987 Dr. Ralph J. Portier
 1988 Gary S. Gasperino
 1989 No winner
 1990 Karl Rocker, Jr.
 1991 William A. Keenan
 1992 Dr. Robert D. Wolff
 1993 Ralph B. Snowberger
 1994 Eugene J. Fasullo
 1995 Richard E. Carlson
 1996 John C. Gribar
 1997 Lt. Col. Wendell L Barnes, USA
 1998 Douglas F. Burke
 1999 James E. Tancreto
 2000 Robert J. Taylor
 2001 Robert M. Moore
 2002 Arthur H. Wu, Ph.D.
 2003 Dennis M. Firman, P.E., ACC/CEC
 2004 Ralph T. Kaneshiro, P.E.                  
 2005 Capt. Tracey J. Spielmann, P.E., USAF
 2006 Capt. Tracey J. Spielmann
 2007 Dominick M. Servedio
 2008 Ruben D. Cruz, Ph.D.
 2009 Lt. Col. Brian Files, P.E., PMP, USAF (Ret.)
 2010 Lt. Col. Monte S. Harner, USAF
 2011 Col. David E. Anderson, P.E., USA
 2012 Capt. Martin Smith, P.E., USN (Ret.)
 2013 CDR Matthew Beck, P.E., USCG
 2014 Joanie A. Campbell, P.E.
 2015 Cdr. Roland De Guzman, P.E., CEC, USN
 2016 Christine Garrett, P.E.
 2019 Melanie Kito, P.E.

See also

 List of engineering awards
 George Washington Goethals
 History of the Panama Canal
 Society of American Military Engineers

References

External links
Society of American Military Engineers official website
Goethals Medal information

Business and industry awards
Engineering awards
American awards